Cynarospermum is a genus of flowering plants belonging to the family Acanthaceae.

Its native range is India.

Species:
 Cynarospermum asperrimum (Nees) Vollesen

References

Acanthaceae
Acanthaceae genera